Gorno Dupeni is a village in the Resen Municipality of North Macedonia, north of Lake Prespa.

Demographics
Gorno Dupeni has 59 inhabitants as of the most recent census of 2002. Macedonians have historically made up almost all of the village population.

References

Villages in Resen Municipality